Mary Black was a slave of African descent in the household of Nathaniel Putnam of the Putnam family who was accused of witchcraft during the Salem witch trials. Nathaniel's nephew was Thomas Putnam, one of the primary accusers, though Nathaniel himself was skeptical and even defended Rebecca Nurse. She returned to Nathaniel's household after she was released, another indication of Nathaniel's view of the charges against her.

Along with Tituba and Candy, Mary was one of three slaves accused during the hysteria. All of them survived.

Arrest

John Hathorne and Jonathan Corwin ordered Mary Black, along with Sarah Wildes, Sarah and Edward Bishop, William and Deliverance Hobbs, Nehemiah Abbot, Mary Eastey, and Mary English to be arrested on April 21, 1692, on "high suspicion" of witchcraft performed on Ann Putnam, Jr., Mercy Lewis, Mary Walcott, and others, due to a complaint by Thomas Putnam and John Buxton.

Examination
Her examination, which was recorded by Samuel Parris, was notable for the fact she was asked to re-pin her neck cloth, which seemingly caused the afflicted girls, including Mary Walcott, Abigail Williams, and Mercy Lewis to be pricked, to the point of drawing blood, according to the transcript. Mary maintained her innocence.

Trial
Mary was put on trial in January 1693, and no one appeared against her, so she was released. In his book, Satan and Salem, Benjamin Ray puts forth the "likely" possibility that Nathaniel Putnam was simply too well respected for anyone to accuse his servant of wrongdoing. He did not accuse her himself, and he paid her jailing fees and took her back into his household. He further theorizes that her steadfast testimony as to her innocence might have been due to Putnam's coaching. Mary's accusers may have been retaliating for Nathaniel having spoken out in defense of Rebecca Nurse. Little else could be gained by accusing a slave, as they did not own property.

Notes

References

Further reading
 Upham, Charles (1980). Salem Witchcraft. New York: Frederick Ungar Publishing Co., v. 2

17th-century African people
Colonial American women
People accused of witchcraft
People of the Salem witch trials
Date of birth unknown
17th-century American women
17th-century African-American women
17th-century African-American people
17th-century American slaves
American women slaves